Antrodiella canadensis is a species of fungus belonging to the family Phanerochaetaceae.

Synonym:
 Tyromyces canadensis (Overh. ex J.Lowe) J.Lowe, 1975

References

Phanerochaetaceae